Anacondas: The Hunt for the Blood Orchid is a 2004 American adventure horror film directed by Dwight Little. It is a stand-alone sequel to the film Anaconda (1997) and the second installment of the Anaconda film series. The film follows a team of researchers set for an expedition into the Southeast Asian tropical island of Borneo, to search for a sacred flower for which they believe will bring humans to a longer and healthier life, but soon become stalked and hunted by the deadly giant anacondas inhabiting the island.

It was released on August 27, 2004, and the last film in the series to be released theatrically. Like its predecessor, the film received negative reviews, but was a financial success. The film was followed by a sequel, Anaconda 3: Offspring in 2008.

Plot 

A team of researchers funded by New York pharmaceutical firm Wexel Hall, including Dr. Jack Byron, Gordon Mitchell, Sam Rogers, Gail Stern, Cole Burris, and Dr. Ben Douglas, leave for a jungle in Borneo to search for a flower called Perrinnia immortalis--"the Blood Orchid"—that they believe contains a fountain of youth. Jack convinces guide Captain Bill Johnson and his partner Tran Wu to take an unsafe path despite their misgivings. At one point, Gail falls into the water, loses her phone, and is attacked by a crocodile before Bill rescues her. Their boat goes over a waterfall and breaks apart. A giant anaconda emerges from the water and swallows Ben whole. The rest of the team reach shore. Bill assures them that it was the largest snake he has ever seen and that it should take weeks for it to grow hungry again. However, most of the team demand that the expedition be called off. They call for Bill's friend, John Livingston, who lives on the river, to join them, only to find Livingston attacked and his boat wrecked.

They find a small native village and a disembowelled anaconda, a pair of human legs hanging out of the snake's abdomen, and an orchid remain. Evidently, the orchids are a part of the food chain, and these snakes grow over unusually long lives. Jack realizes the orchids must be nearby, while Gail contends that the orchids may not work on humans. Jack still wants to find the flowers, but the others rebel and start building an escape raft to leave the jungle.

Gordon discovers that Jack has hid Livingston's radio and gun. The now-sociopathic Jack fails to convince him to continue with the expedition, so he paralyzes Gordon using a previously collected spider to stop him from informing the others. Jack joins the others at the raft, but a suspicious Sam discovers Gordon and the spider bite. An anaconda swallows Gordon alive as she informs the others, who arrive as it finishes. Bill sets the building on fire, but notices the snake has escaped. Jack, left alone, steals the raft.

Unable to make another raft, they hack through the jungle to beat Jack to the orchids and retrieve their raft. On the way, they fall into a cave trying to escape from an anaconda. Cole gets lost and finds human skeletons. He is found by Tran, who then gets pulled under and eaten. Bill, looking for the two, finds Tran's lost flashlight floating in bloody water. A terrified Cole escapes from the cave, seconds ahead of the snake, which gets stuck in the hole. Sam beheads it with a machete, but another snake captures the hysterical Cole. The team follows to find him being constricted. Bill throws his knife and impales the snake through the head, freeing Cole.

The group finds Jack and his raft. Jack shoots Bill in the arm to keep him from attacking and forces the party to accompany him to the orchids, which grow above a pit in which a ball of male anacondas are mating with the female. Sam is forced to cross the pit via a thin log to fill a backpack with orchids. As she returns, the log cracks. Jack orders her to throw him the backpack. Sam threatens to drop the flowers into the pit, but Jack threatens to shoot the others in response. The log breaks. As the others try to reach Sam, Jack reaches for the backpack. The spider he used earlier escapes from its jar and bites him. He falls into the pit and is devoured. The vine holding Sam also gives way, but she climbs out of the pit as one of the anacondas tries to get her. Gail tricks the snake into biting their fuel container. Bill shoots it, but the gun is empty. Cole shoots a flare, setting the anaconda on fire and exploding the container, killing the other snakes. An ensuing landslide buries the blood orchids. The survivors—Bill, Sam, Cole and Gail—make it back to the raft and head to Kota Bharu.

Cast
 Johnny Messner as Bill Johnson
 KaDee Strickland as Sam Rogers
 Matthew Marsden as Dr. Jack Byron
 Eugene Byrd as Cole Burris
 Salli Richardson-Whitfield as Gail Stern
 Morris Chestnut as Gordon Mitchell
 Karl Yune as Tran Wu
 Nicholas Gonzalez as Dr. Ben Douglas
 Andy Anderson as John Livingston

Soundtrack 

The soundtrack for the film was composed by Nerida Tyson-Chew and released by Varèse Sarabande.

 Track listing
 Opening Titles / Jungle Floor (2:12)
 Elixir Perrinia Immortalis (1:40)
 Kong Attacks Gail (2:04) 
 Stealing the Fruit / Kong Terrified (3:06)
 Almost a Kiss (1:20)
 Predator in the Water (3:53)
 Enter the Jungle (0:56)
 Foreboding Path (2:22)
 Crossing the Bog (3:29)
 Spider of Anaesthesia (2:58)
 Livingston's Death (1:05)
 All Hope is Lost (1:58)
 Lopaks (1:36)
 It's Mating Season (3:15)
 Totem (1:34)
 Jack's Devious Deal Uncovered (1:23)
 Betrayal of Trust (2:28)
 The Cavern (6:31)
 Climbing to the Light (6:02)
 Discovering the Orchids / Face Off (11:14)

Reception

Box office 
Anacondas: The Hunt for the Blood Orchid debuted at second place in the box office, earned $32,238,923 in the United States and the international gross of $38,753,975, bringing a worldwide total of $70,992,898.

Critical reception 
Rotten Tomatoes reports that the film received a 25% based on 120 reviews, with an average rating of 4.20 out of 10. The site's critics consensus reads: "A cheesy monster B-movie".

Metacritic reported the film had an average score of 40 out of 100 based on 28 reviews. Roger Ebert awarded the film two out of four stars, a rating less than that he gave the original film. Ebert, however, praised Matthew Marsden's performance as being "suitably treacherous". Keith Philipps of The A.V. Club criticized the movie for its CGI snakes, while The Oregonian'''s Karen Karbo said it never "takes itself too seriously". Audiences polled by CinemaScore gave the film an average grade of "B" on an A+ to F scale.

 Awards 
The film was nominated for a Razzie Award for Worst Remake or Sequel, but lost to Scooby-Doo 2: Monsters Unleashed''.

See also 
 List of killer snake films

References

External links 

 
 
 
 
 

2004 films
2004 horror films
2004 action thriller films
2000s horror thriller films
American horror thriller films
American monster movies
American natural horror films
American sequel films
Anaconda (film series)
Screen Gems films
Treasure hunt films
Films directed by Dwight H. Little
Films set in Asia
Films set in Borneo
Films set in New York City
Films set in jungles
Films set on boats
Films shot in New Zealand
Films shot in Fiji
Films about snakes
Giant monster films
Films scored by Nerida Tyson-Chew
2000s monster movies
2000s English-language films
2000s American films